The River Suck is a river within the Shannon River Basin in Ireland, 133 km (82.5 mi) in length. It is the main tributary of the River Shannon. It meets the Shannon a kilometre south of the village of Shannonbridge.

Name
The river's name is derived from the Irish suca. The Placenames Branch of the government Department of Tourism, Culture, Arts, Gaeltacht, Sport and Media observed that "the root word is wrapped in a web of uncertainty and lost in the mists of time". Edmund Hogan's Onomasticon Goedelicum (1910) records the spellings suġ (sugh), suggesting connections to Old Irish súg ("juice, sap").

Course
It forms much of the border between County Roscommon and County Galway, flowing along the western side of County Roscommon. Together with the Shannon on the east, it creates the long narrow form of southern County Roscommon.

The river rises in hills on the border of County Mayo and County Roscommon, and passes from Lough O'Flynn in a general south and south-easterly direction. Settlements along the river include Athleague, Ballinasloe, Ballyforan, Ballymoe, Castlerea, Glinsk, and Tulrush, and it flows into the River Shannon a kilometre south of the village of Shannonbridge.

Geography
The water is clean and unpolluted and the river flows through unspoilt countryside with moorland, water meadows and pastureland. Some stretches are fast-flowing while others are slow and meandering. There are abundant bream, rudd and tench in some parts, and perch and pike are also plentiful. To prevent flooding at Ballinasloe, a weir was erected in 1885 immediately above the four-arch bridge, with draw-doors which can be raised when there is an approaching flood.

Suck Valley Way
The Suck Valley Way is a long-distance trail. It is designated as a National Waymarked Trail by the National Trails Office of the Irish Sports Council and is managed by Roscommon County Council, Roscommon Integrated Development Company and the Suck Valley Committee.

See also
 Rivers of Ireland

References

External links

 The River Suck Parliamentary Gazetteer of Ireland, 1846.

Rivers of County Galway
Rivers of County Roscommon
Tributaries of the River Shannon